Đoka (also transliterated Djoka) is a Serbian nickname, a diminutive (and hypocorism) of Đorđe (George). The patronymics Đoković and Đokić are derived from the name. It may refer to:

 Đoka Mijatović (1848–78), Serbian socialist
 Đorđe Milovanović (1956–2009), Serbian footballer nicknamed Đoka bomba
 Đoka Bogdanović (1860–1914), Serbian film producer and cameraman that recorded the First Balkan War.
 Đoka Radulović, co-founder of Ikarbus

References

Serbian masculine given names
Hypocorisms